Pleasant Valley High School is a public high school in Brodheadsville, Pennsylvania (U.S.). It is the sole high school operated by the Pleasant Valley School District. 

As of the 2020-21 school year, the school had an enrollment of 1,313 students.

The school's name was given by its founder, John C. Mills, who took it from a common name for the area used by the locals. Pleasant Valley High School is located on U.S. Route 209. The building was built in 1960 and renovated in 2005. The school had 1,569 students as of the 2018–2019 school year.

Athletics

Pleasant Valley competes athletically in the Eastern Pennsylvania Conference (EPC) in District XI of the Pennsylvania Interscholastic Athletic Association (PIAA), one of the premier high school athletic divisions in the nation.

The district funds the following varsity sports:

Boys
Baseball - AAAA
Basketball- AAAA
Cross Country - AAA
Football - AAAA
Golf - AAA
Soccer - AAA
Tennis - AAA
Track and Field - AAA
Wrestling - AAA

Girls
Basketball - AAAA
Cheerleading - AAAA
Cross Country - AAA
Field hockey - AAA
Soccer (Fall) - AAA
Softball - AAAA
Tennis - AAA
Track and Field - AAA
Volleyball - AAA

According to PIAA directory July 2013 

Pleasant Valley has had athletic successes in many different events.  For over a dozen years, the baseball team was undefeated. All of the school's teams participate in the Eastern Pennsylvania Conference.

Pleasant Valley Wrestling The wrestling program has grown strong over the past several years. In 2002-2003, the school was ranked top 10 in the PIAA AAA and the top 50 nationally. Two wrestlers medaled in 2010 PIAA states.

Pleasant Valley Football The Pleasant Valley Football program was a major contender in the Mountain Valley Conference (MVC) for quite some time, winning the District 11 Championship in 1999 and numerous Conference Championships. Since then, they were MVC champions a few more times and continued to be a top competitor in the MVC. A new head football coach, Jimmy Terwilliger, was hired in March 2009. Terwilliger, the former Harlon Hill Trophy winner (considered to be the Division II equivalent of the Heisman Trophy), tried to put the Bears back in the MVC race. The proudest part of Pleasant Valley Football's history is "The Old Oaken Bucket". It is an annual rivalry game between the Pocono Mountain East Cardinals and the PV Bears, which has been played since the 1960s.  For 8 years, up until the 07–08 season, the Bears have kept the bucket. This is an individual record for the most times in a row either of the teams have had the bucket. Also Pleasant Valley has had the bucket, the trophy given to the team who wins the game each year that really is a bucket with a football trophy topper on it, the most times out of all 40+ years they have been playing this game. Pleasant Valley currently holds "The Bucket" after an emotional game that came down to the last play. Pleasant Valley won 24–19. Pleasant Valley leads the series with Pocono Mountain.

Arts
In 2010, Pleasant Valley High School Marching Band was crowned the USBands Group 4A Pennsylvania State Champions with their show "Western Portraits." The show included songs such as "The Magnificent Seven", Silverado, and Hoedown.

References

External links
Official website

Public high schools in Pennsylvania
Educational institutions established in 1960
Schools in Monroe County, Pennsylvania
1960 establishments in Pennsylvania